Malkit Singh Tehang was president of the management committee of the Guru Nanak Gurdwara Smethwick, in Smethwick in the West Midlands of England.

References

Singh, Gurharpal and Darshan Singh Tatla. Sikhs in Britain. London, New York: Zed Books, 2006. 

Living people
Year of birth missing (living people)